Kuhio Beach Park  is a public ocean-side park on the island of Oahu, U.S. state of Hawaii, located within Waikiki Beach. It's a common gathering place for the Honolulu population and tourists due to its location and semi-protected waters.

The park was named for Jonah Kūhiō Kalaniana'ole, the youngest son of Kekaulike Kinoiki II and High Chief David Kahalepouli Piʻikoi.  The current park was the site of Pualeilani, the home of Prince Kūhiō and his wife, Princess Elizabeth Kahanu. In July 1918, the prince removed a high board fence, opening a section of the beach to the public. The property was given to the city after his death in 1922, and Kuhio Beach Park was officially dedicated in 1940.

Kuhio Beach Park is the site of three well-known statues and public artworks: the statue of Duke Kahanamoku by Jan Gordon Fisher (1990), the statue of Prince Jonah Kuhio by Sean Browne (2001), and the monument the Stones of Life (1997), (in Hawaiian: Nā Pōhaku Ola O Kapaemahu A Me Kapuni), a sculpture incorporating ancient basaltic stones representing four legendary healers, Kapaemahu, Kahaloa, Kapuni and Kinohi, who came to Hawai'i from distant lands.

The park hosts two famous surf breaks, Queen's and Canoes, where several surf competitions are held annually.

See also
 List of beaches in Oahu

References

Beaches of Oahu
Geography of Honolulu
Parks in Hawaii
Protected areas of Oahu
Tourist attractions in Honolulu
Waikiki
Protected areas established in 1940
1940 establishments in Hawaii